In each box is a list of all the international matches played by the England national rugby union team in each decade.

Matches

A standard points scoring system was only agreed in 1891 .

Tours

In 1963 England went on their first tour to the Southern Hemisphere. They played the All Blacks and the Wallabies.

Honours

 Shared*

Head coaches

Stats

Overall 

Below is a summary table of capped England matches up to 27 November 2022.

See also
 History of the England national rugby union team

References

External links
 StatsGuru@scrum.com - an excellent, fully searchable database of all international rugby matches
 rugbydata.com statistics
 England statistics at lassen.co.nz

 
Matches